Erik Just-Olsen (born 20 March 1946) is a Norwegian footballer. He played in three matches for the Norway national football team in 1975.

References

External links
 

1946 births
Living people
Norwegian footballers
Norway international footballers
Place of birth missing (living people)
Association footballers not categorized by position